Sae (written: , , , , , ,  in hiragana or  in katakana) is a feminine Japanese given name. Notable people with the name include:

, Japanese actress
, Japanese shogi player
, Japanese artistic gymnast
, Japanese singer and actress
, Japanese singer
, Japanese judoka
, Japanese educator
, Japanese gymnast

Fictional characters
Sae, a character in the manga series Hidamari Sketch
Sae, a character from the manga and anime Twin Star Exorcist
Sae Niijima, a character in the video game Persona 5
Sae Kurosawa, a character from the horror video game  Fatal Frame II: Crimson Butterfly
Sae Itoshi, a character in the manga series Blue Lock

Japanese feminine given names